The National Board of Osteopathic Medical Examiners (NBOME), founded in 1934 as the National Osteopathic Board of Examiners for Osteopathic Physicians and Surgeons, Inc., is a United States examination board which sets state recognized examinations for osteopathic medical students and began administering exams in February 1935. The NBOME is an independent, not-for-profit organization and is headquartered in Chicago, Illinois and Conshohocken, Pennsylvania. The NBOME states that its mission is "to protect the public by providing the means to assess competencies for osteopathic medicine and related health care professions." The NBOME conducts research to monitor the quality of the COMLEX examinations. 

The Comprehensive Osteopathic Medical Licensing Examination (COMLEX) is a multi-part professional examination and must be passed successfully before a Doctor of Osteopathic Medicine (D.O.) can obtain a license to practice medicine in the United States.

History
In 1987, the name was changed from National Osteopathic Board of Examiners for Osteopathic Physicians and Surgeons, Inc. to the National Board of Osteopathic Medical Examiners, Inc.

The NBOME began administering the COMLEX Level 1 in 1998; COMLEX Level 2 in 1997, and COMLEX Level 3 in 1995. The NBOME transitioned to computer-based versions of the COMLEX Level 2 in July, 2005; COMLEX Level 3 in September, 2005 and COMLEX Level 1 in May, 2006.

The NBOME co-sponsored the 10th Annual International Conference on Medical Regulation, which took place at the Ottawa Convention Centre in Ontario, Canada in October 2012.

See also
National Board of Medical Examiners
Comprehensive Osteopathic Medical Licensing Examination

References

Non-profit organizations based in Chicago
Medical and health professional associations in Chicago
Medical regulation in the United States
Organizations established in 1934
Osteopathic medical associations in the United States